Phyllocarida is a subclass of crustaceans, comprising the extant order Leptostraca and the extinct orders Hymenostraca and Archaeostraca.

See also
Ceratiocaris
Cinerocaris
Vladicaris

References

External links

Malacostraca
Arthropod subclasses
Paleozoic crustaceans
Mesozoic crustaceans
Cenozoic crustaceans
Extant Cambrian first appearances
Taxa described in 1879
Taxa named by Alpheus Spring Packard